Richard Monroe Barnes (born July 21, 1959) is an American former professional baseball pitcher who appeared in parts of two seasons in the Major League Baseball (MLB), playing for the Chicago White Sox in 1982 and the Cleveland Indians in 1983.

He made his MLB debut at age 22 on July 18, 1982 and appeared in his last game at the age of 24 on September 25, 1983.

References

External links

1959 births
Living people
American expatriate baseball players in Canada
Baseball players from Florida
Charleston Charlies players
Chicago White Sox players
Cleveland Indians players
Denver Bears players
Edmonton Trappers players
Gulf Coast White Sox players
Iowa Cubs players
Knoxville Sox players
Maine Guides players
Major League Baseball pitchers
Sportspeople from Palm Beach, Florida
Tucson Toros players